Eoghan O'Flaherty is a Gaelic footballer from Kildare. He plays club football for his local Carbury and has been a member of the Kildare senior squad since 2009. His older brother Morgan is also a member of the team. Eoin was part of the Kildare under 21 team that lost the All Ireland Under 21 final in 2008.

References

Year of birth missing (living people)
Living people
Kildare inter-county Gaelic footballers